The Iberian Revolutionary Liberation Directory (DRIL; Directorio Revolucionario Ibérico de Liberación in Spanish and Galician language or  Directório Revolucionário Ibérico de Libertação in Portuguese) was an armed organization formed by Spaniards (mainly Galicians) and Portuguese opponents of the Iberian dictatorships. The organization had two general secretaries: Humberto Delgado (Portuguese) and Xosé Velo Mosquera (Galician).

History
The first action of the DRIL was in February 1960, consisting of several bomb attacks in Madrid. A member of the DRIL, José Ramón Pérez Jurado, died during this action due to the explosion of one of the artifacts. His companion Antonio Abad Donoso was arrested and, although none of the explosions produced any victims, was sentenced to death and executed on 8 March of the same year.

The most famous action of the DRIL was the Santa Maria hijacking, in 1961. DRIL militants seized control of Santa Maria, a 609-foot-long (186 m), 20,900-ton Portuguese luxury cruise liner. After talks with the Brazilian government, led by Jânio Quadros, DRIL members laid down their guns and drove the ship to Recife in exchange for receiving political refugee status. The ship was returned to its owners of the Portuguese Company Colonial de Navegação.

The organization continued to carry sporadic attacks between 1961 and 1964, when the organization dissolved.

References 

 Xurxo Martínez Crespo: O Directorio Revolucionario Ibérico de Liberación (DRIL). Fesga, 2011.
 Armando Recio García: El secuestro del Santa María en la prensa del régimen franquista. Revista Historia y Comunicación Social, 2005, vol. 10 (Universidad Complutense de Madrid)

Left-wing militant groups in Spain
Organizations established in 1958
Organizations disestablished in 1964
Anti-Francoism
1958 establishments in Spain